The following is the orders, decorations, and medals given by Yang di-Pertuan Besar of Negeri Sembilan. When applicable, post-nominal letters and non-hereditary titles are indicated.

Order of precedence for the wearing of order insignias, decorations, and medals  
Precedence:

Orders, decorations, and medals 

The Most Illustrious Royal Family Order of Negeri Sembilan - Darjah Kerabat Negeri Sembilan Yang Amat Mulia
 Founded by Tuanku Jaafar on 24 May 1979.
 Awarded in a single class to Heads of State and their consorts - D.K.N.S.

The Order of Negeri Sembilan - Darjah Negeri Sembilan
 Founded by Tuanku Jaafar on 24 May 1979 as a single class award - D.N.S.
 Expanded and re-organized by Tuanku Muhriz in 2010 into two degrees
 1. Paramount or Tertinggi - limited to the rulers of the constituent negri - D.T.N.S. 
 2. Illustrious or Mulia - limited to the consorts of the rulers - D.M.N.S.

The Royal Family Order of Yamtuan Radin Sunnah - Darjah Kerabat Yamtuan Radin Sunnah
 Founded by Tuanku Jaafar on 24 May 1979. 
 Awarded in a single class to legitimate members of the Royal Family descended from Yamtuan Radin Sunnah - D.K.Y.R.

The Most Esteemed Order of Loyalty to Negeri Sembilan - Darjah Setia Negeri Sembilan Yang Amat Dihormati
 Founded by Tuanku Jaafar on 24 May 1979 as a general order of merit to reward and recognise loyal service to the state in all fields of endeavour. 
 Re-organized with new insignia by Tuanku Muhriz in 2010. Awarded in five classes : 
 1. Principal Grand Knight or Dato’ Sri Utama - S.U.N.S. (previously Knight Grand Commander or Dato’ Sri Paduka - S.P.N.S. )
 2. Knight Grand Companion or Dato’ Sri Setia - S.S.N.S.
 3. Knight Commander or Dato’ Paduka - D.P.N.S. (previously Knight Companion or Dato’ Setia - D.S.N.S. )
 4. Companion - D.N.S.
 5. Member or Ahli - A.N.S.

The Order of Loyalty to Tuanku Muhriz - Darjah Setia Tuanku Muhriz
 Founded by Tuanku Muhriz on 14 January 2010 to supersede the Loyal Order of Tuanku Ja’afar and to recognise and reward loyal and meritorious service to the reigning YDP. 
 Awarded in four classes :
 1. Grand Knight of the Most Conspicuous Loyal Order of Tuanku Muhriz - Darjah Sri Setia Tuanku Muhriz Yang Amat Terbilang 
 with the personal title of Dato’ Sri - S.S.T.M. 
 2. Knight of the Most Meritorious Loyal Order of Tuanku Muhriz - Darjah Setia Tuanku Muhriz Yang Amat Gemilang
 with the personal title of Dato’ - D.S.T.M.
 3. Companion - D.T.M.
 4. Associate or Setiawan - S.T.M. 
 5. and a medal  : Heraldic Medal or Pingat Bentara - B.T.M.

The Order of Loyal Service to Negeri Sembilan - Darjah Setia Bakti Negeri Sembilan 
 Founded by Tuanku Muhriz on 14 January 2010 to recognise and reward loyal service to the YDP and state of Negri Sembilan in the fields of politics, business or meritorious service by distinguished individuals. 
 Awarded in a single class, Knight or Dato’ - D.B.N.S.

The Most Blessed Grand Order of Tuanku Jaafar - Darjah Kebesaran Sri Tuanku Jaafar Yang Amat Terpuji
 Founded by Tuanku Jaafar on 18 July 1984 to reward loyal service to the YDP and to recognise meritorious service. 
 Awarded in two classes (Obsolete 14 January 2010) : 
 1. Knight Grand Commander or Dato’ Sri Paduka - S.P.T.J.
 2. Knight Commander or Dato’ Paduka - D.P.T.J.

The Distinguished Conduct Order - Darjah Pekerti Terpilih
 Founded by Tuanku Muhriz as a reward of merit for federal or state civil servants who have displayed distinguished conduct within their profession or occupation. 
 Awarded in a single class - D.P.T.

Conspicuous Gallantry Medal - Pingat Keberanian Cemerlang
 Instituted by Tuanku Abdul Rahman on 31 August 1950 as a reward for acts of conspicuous gallantry and heroism. 
 Awarded in a single class, silver medal (P.K.C.)

Distinguished Conduct Medal - Pingat Pekerti Terpilih
 Instituted by Tuanku Abdul Rahman on 31 August 1950 to reward acts of bravery. 
 Awarded in a single class, bronze medal (P.P.T.)

Medal for Outstanding Public Service - Pingat Khidmat Masyarakat Cemerlang
 Instituted by Tuanku Jaafar on 24 May 1979 to reward meritorious public service by those in public employ. 
 Awarded in a single class, bronze medal (P.M.C.)

Meritorious Service Medal - Pingat Jasa Kebaktian
 Instituted by Tuanku Abdul Rahman on 31 August 1950 to reward meritorious public service by those in public employ. 
 Awarded in a single class, bronze medal (P.J.K.)

Long Service Medal - Pingat Khidmat Lama
 Instituted by Tuanku Jaafar on 11 January 1968 to reward long service by state employees of not less than twenty-five years duration. 
 Awarded in a single class, bronze medal (P.K.L.)

Defence Medal - Pingat Pertahanan
 Instituted by Tuanku Jaafar in 1972 as a service medal. 
 Awarded in a single class, silver medal.

Installation Medal 1961 - Pingat Pertabalan 1961
 Instituted by Tuanku Munawir to commemorate his installation on 17 April 1961. Awarded in a single class, silver medal.

Installation Medal 1968 - Pingat Pertabalan 1968
 Instituted by Tuanku Jaafar to commemorate his installation on 8 April 1968. 
 Awarded in a single class, silver medal.

Silver Jubilee Medal - Pingat Jubli Perak
 Instituted by Tuanku Jaafar in 1992 to commemorate his commemorate the twenty-fifth anniversary of his installation as Yang di-Pertuan. 
 Awarded in a single class, silver medal (P.J.P.)

See also 

 Orders, decorations, and medals of the Malaysian states and federal territories#Negeri Sembilan
 List of post-nominal letters (Negeri Sembilan)

References 

 
Negeri Sembilan